Ogden Bingham Compton (August 25, 1932 – August 13, 2020) was a former American football quarterback in the National Football League. He played for the Chicago Cardinals. He played college football for Hardin–Simmons.

On November 13, 1955, Compton threw the only touchdown pass of his NFL career, a completion to Dick "Night Train" Lane that covered 98 yards, the second longest pass in NFL history up to that time.

References

1932 births
2020 deaths
American football quarterbacks
Chicago Cardinals players
Hardin–Simmons Cowboys football players
Players of American football from New York (state)
Sportspeople from Ithaca, New York